David Knapp may refer to:

 David C. Knapp (1927–2010), American educational administrator
 David Berry Knapp, mayor of Rajneeshpuram